The Treaty of Rome, or EEC Treaty (officially the Treaty establishing the European Economic Community), brought about the creation of the European Economic Community (EEC), the best known of the European Communities (EC). The treaty was signed on 25 March 1957 by Belgium, France, Italy, Luxembourg, the Netherlands and West Germany, and it came into force on 1 January 1958. Originally the "Treaty establishing the European Economic Community", and now continuing under the name "Treaty on the Functioning of the European Union", it remains one of the two most important treaties in what is now the European Union (EU).

The treaty proposed the progressive reduction of customs duties and the establishment of a customs union. It proposed to create a single market for goods, labour, services, and capital across member states. It also proposed the creation of a Common Agriculture Policy, a Common Transport Policy and a European Social Fund and established the European Commission.

The treaty has been amended on several occasions since 1957. The Maastricht Treaty of 1992 removed the word "economic" from the Treaty of Rome's official title, and in 2009, the Treaty of Lisbon renamed it the "Treaty on the Functioning of the European Union".

History

Background
In 1951, the Treaty of Paris was signed, creating the European Coal and Steel Community (ECSC). The Treaty of Paris was an international treaty based on international law, designed to help reconstruct the economies of the European continent, prevent war in Europe and ensure a lasting peace.
 
The original idea was conceived by Jean Monnet, a senior French civil servant and it was announced by Robert Schuman, the French Foreign Minister, in a declaration on 9 May 1950. The aim was to pool Franco-West German coal and steel production, because the two raw materials were the basis of the industry (including war industry) and power of the two countries. The proposed plan was that Franco-West German coal and steel production would be placed under a common High Authority within the framework of an organisation that would be open for participation to other European countries. The underlying political objective of the European Coal and Steel Community was to strengthen Franco-German cooperation and banish the possibility of war.

France, West Germany, Italy, Belgium, Luxembourg, and the Netherlands began negotiating the treaty. The Treaty Establishing the ECSC was signed in Paris on 18 April 1951, and entered into force on 24 July 1952. The Treaty expired on 23 July 2002, after fifty years, as was foreseen. The common market opened on 10 February 1953 for coal, iron ore and scrap, and on 1 May 1953 for steel.

Partly in the aim of creating a United States of Europe, two further Communities were proposed, again by the French. A European Defence Community (EDC) and a European Political Community (EPC). While the treaty for the latter was being drawn up by the Common Assembly, the ECSC parliamentary chamber, the EDC was rejected by the French Parliament. President Jean Monnet, a leading figure behind the Communities, resigned from the High Authority in protest and began work on alternative Communities, based on economic integration rather than political integration.

As a result of the energy crises, the Common Assembly proposed extending the powers of the ECSC to cover other sources of energy. However, Monnet desired a separate Community to cover nuclear power, and Louis Armand was put in charge of a study into the prospects of nuclear energy use in Europe. The report concluded that further nuclear development was needed, in order to fill the deficit left by the exhaustion of coal deposits and to reduce dependence on oil producers. The Benelux states and West Germany were also keen on creating a general common market; however, this was opposed by France owing to its protectionist policy, and Monnet thought it too large and difficult a task. In the end, Monnet proposed creating both as separate Communities to attempt to satisfy all interests. As a result of the Messina Conference of 1955, Paul-Henri Spaak was appointed as chairman of a preparatory committee, the Spaak Committee, charged with the preparation of a report on the creation of a common European market. The both texts (Spaak report and Treaty of Rome) were drafted by Pierre Uri a close collaborator of Monnet.

Move towards a single market
The Spaak Report drawn up by the Spaak Committee provided the basis for further progress and was accepted at the Venice Conference (29 and 30 May 1956) where the decision was taken to organise an Intergovernmental Conference. The report formed the cornerstone of the Intergovernmental Conference on the Common Market and Euratom at Val Duchesse in 1956.

The outcome of the conference was that the new Communities would share the Common Assembly (now the Parliamentary Assembly) with the ECSC, as they would the European Court of Justice. However, they would not share the ECSC's Council of High Authority. The two new High Authorities would be called Commissions, from a reduction in their powers. France was reluctant to agree to more supranational powers; hence, the new Commissions would have only basic powers, and important decisions would have to be approved by the Council (of national Ministers), which now adopted majority voting. Euratom fostered co-operation in the nuclear field, at the time a very popular area, and the European Economic Community was to create a full customs union between members.

Signing

The conference led to the signing on 25 March 1957, of the Treaty establishing the European Economic Community and the Euratom Treaty at the Palazzo dei Conservatori on Capitoline Hill in Rome. 25 March 1957 was also the Catholic feast day of the Annunciation of Mary. 

In March 2007, the BBC's Today radio programme reported that delays in printing the treaty meant that the document signed by the European leaders as the Treaty of Rome consisted of blank pages between its frontispiece and page for the signatures.

Anniversary commemorations
Major anniversaries of the signing of the Treaty of Rome have been commemorated in numerous ways.

Commemorative coins

Commemorative coins have been struck by numerous European countries, notably at the 30th and 50th anniversaries (1987 and 2007 respectively).

2007 celebrations in Berlin
In 2007, celebrations culminated in Berlin with the Berlin declaration preparing the Lisbon Treaty.

2017 celebrations in Rome

In 2017, Rome was the centre of multiple official and popular celebrations. Street demonstrations were largely in favour of European unity and integration, according to several news sources.

Historical assessment
According to the historian Tony Judt, the Treaty of Rome did not represent a fundamental turning point in the history of European integration:

Timeline

See also
 History of the European Union
 Intergovernmental Conference on the Common Market and Euratom
 Ohlin Report
 Spaak Report
 European Coal and Steel Community
 Euratom
 European Economic Community

References

External links

 Documents of Treaty of Rome's negotiations are at the Historical Archives of the EU in Florence
 Documents of Treaty establishing the European Economic Community in EUR-Lex
 History of the Rome Treaties – CVCE (Centre for European Studies)
 Treaty establishing the European Economic Community – CVCE (Centre for European Studies)
 Happy Birthday EU — Union wide design competition to mark the 50th anniversary of the Treaty
 60th anniversary of the Treaty of Rome – Official Site

Treaty on the Functioning of the European Union
1950s in Rome
1957 in Europe
1957 in Italy
Treaties concluded in 1957
Treaties entered into force in 1958
1957 in the European Economic Community
1958 in the European Economic Community
1957 in economics
March 1957 events in Europe
Events in Rome